The Student Organization of Iran is a non-governmental organization affiliated to the Ministry of Education of Iran. It provides social education.

History 
The Iranian Scout Organization was established in 1925, considering the activities in this field. After the revolution, it was dissolved in mid-1985 and the Youth and Adolescents Organization was formed. The renamed organization started its activities on May 10, 1999.

References

External links 
The Official page of Student Organization on Instagram 
The Official website

Education in Iran
Schools in Iran
1999 establishments in Iran